Kazembe is a traditional kingdom in modern-day Zambia. Kazembe may also refer to
Kazembe (Mwansabombwe), a town in Zambia
Eunice Kazembe (1952–2013), Malawian politician 
Mihayo Kazembe (born 1976), football player from the Democratic Republic of the Congo 
Raphael Kazembe (born 1947), Malawian cyclist